Luka Špik (born 9 February 1979 in Kranj, SR Slovenia) is a Slovenian rower and Olympic gold medalist.

At the 2005 World Championship, he won gold in the Double Sculls event together with Iztok Čop and silver in the Quadruple Sculls with Iztok Čop, Matej Prelog and Davor Mizerit.

He also won the 2007 World Championships in M2X.

Špik and Iztok Čop won the 1999 World Championship, and also the gold at the 2000 Sydney Olympics, which was the first Olympic gold medal for independent Slovenia.

Špik and Čop were the favourites to win the men's double sculls at the 2004 Summer Olympics, but finished in silver medal position.

Coming into the 2012 Summer Olympics they were not the favourites, however with a strong performance in the semi-finals they announced they could be in the running for a medal. In the final of the Men's double sculls after taking an early lead and holding it until nearly the 1500 m mark, they lost the lead to the Italians and the later winners from New Zealand. They finished in the third position, giving Slovenia the second medal of the Olympics after Urška Žolnir won gold 2 days earlier.

Achievements

Olympic Games
 2000: Sydney (AUS) – 1st place (double scull with Iztok Cop)
 2004: Athens (GRE) – 2nd place (double scull with Iztok Cop)
 2012: London (GBR) – 3rd place (double scull with Iztok Čop)
 2008: Beijing (CHN) – 6th place (double scull with Iztok Cop)

Junior World Championships
 1998: Ioannina (GRE)-1st place (single scull)
 1997:Hazewinkel (BEL)-1st place (single scull)
 1995:Poznań (POL)-2nd place (single scull)
 1994:Munich (GER)-6th place single scull)

World Championships:
 2007: Munich (GER) – 1st place (double scull)
 2006: Eton (GBR) – 2nd place (double scull)
 2005: Gifu (JPN) – 1st place (double scull), 2nd place (quadruple scull)
 2003: Milan (ITA)-4th place (double scull with Prelog)
 2002: Seville (ESP)-8th place (4x; Novak, Sracnjek, Bozic)
 2001: Luzern (CH)-5th place (double scull with MIzerit)
 1999: St. Catharines (CAN)-1st place (double scull with Iztok Cop)

References

External links

 luka-spik.com- Official website (Slovene and English)

1979 births
Living people
Slovenian male rowers
Olympic rowers of Slovenia
Rowers at the 1996 Summer Olympics
Rowers at the 2000 Summer Olympics
Rowers at the 2004 Summer Olympics
Rowers at the 2008 Summer Olympics
Rowers at the 2012 Summer Olympics
Olympic gold medalists for Slovenia
Olympic silver medalists for Slovenia
Olympic bronze medalists for Slovenia
Sportspeople from Kranj
Olympic medalists in rowing
Medalists at the 2012 Summer Olympics
World Rowing Championships medalists for Slovenia
Medalists at the 2004 Summer Olympics
Medalists at the 2000 Summer Olympics